The 4709th Air Defense Wing is a discontinued United States Air Force organization.  Its last assignment was with the 26th Air Division of Air Defense Command (ADC) at McGuire Air Force Base, New Jersey, where it was discontinued in 1956.  It was established in 1952 at McGuire as the 4709th Defense Wing in a general reorganization of Air Defense Command (ADC), which replaced wings responsible for a base with wings responsible for a geographical area.  It assumed control of several fighter Interceptor squadrons that had been assigned to the 52d Fighter-Interceptor Wing, some of which were Air National Guard squadrons mobilized for the Korean War.  It also assumed host responsibility for McGuire through its subordinate 568th Air Base Group.

In early 1953 it also was assigned two radar squadrons guarding the approaches to New York City and its dispersed fighter squadrons combined with colocated air base squadrons into air defense groups.  When Mcguire became a Military Air Transport Service (MATS) base in 1954, the 4709th became a tenant at McGuire.  The wing was redesignated as an air defense wing the same year. Starting in 1956, in preparation for the implementation of the Semi-Automatic Ground Environment (SAGE) automated air defense system, the 4621st Air Defense Wing was activated at McGuire and attached to the 4709th. Its radar units were transferred to the 4621st and the wing was discontinued in 1956.

History
The wing was organized as the 4709th Defense Wing at the beginning of February 1952 at McGuire AFB, New Jersey as part of a major reorganization of ADC responding to ADC's difficulty under the existing wing base organizational structure in deploying fighter squadrons to best advantage. It assumed operational control and the air defense mission of fighter squadrons formerly assigned to the inactivating 52d Fighter-Interceptor Wing (FIW). The 2d Fighter-Interceptor Squadron (FIS) and the 5th FIS, flying F-94 Starfire interceptor aircraft, were located at McGuire.  The federalized 105th FIS was located at Berry Field, Nashville, Tennessee and was flying World War II era F-47 Thunderbolt aircraft. The wing also was assigned another federalized Air National Guard (ANG) squadron, the 118th FIS at Suffolk County AFB, New York, also flying Thunderbolts, which was reassigned from the inactivating 103d FIW. The support elements of the 52d FIW's 52d Air Base Group (ABG) and 52d Maintenance & Supply Group were replaced at McGuire by the wing's 568th ABG and air base squadrons were activated at each of the dispersed bases assigned to the wing to support the fighter squadrons at those stations.  The wing's mission was to train and maintain tactical units in a state of readiness to intercept and destroy enemy aircraft attempting to penetrate the air defense system in the Northeastern United States.

The stay of the 105th FIS with the wing was brief.  In July 1952, it moved to McGhee Tyson Municipal Airport, Knoxville, Tennessee, and the next month as areas of responsibility for air defense were realigned, transferred to the 35th Air Division. In November, the 118th FIS was returned to the Connecticut ANG and its personnel and equipment handed over to the newly activating 45th FIS. A second fighter squadron, the 75th Fighter-Interceptor Squadron, flying Sabres, moved to Suffolk County from Presque Isle AFB, Maine in October and was assigned to the wing, while at Sewart AFB, New York, the 330th Fighter-Interceptor Squadron, flying F-80 Shooting Star aircraft, was activated and assigned to the wing.

In February 1953, another major reorganization of ADC activated Air Defense Groups (Air Def Gp) at ADC bases with dispersed fighter squadrons.  These groups were assigned to the wing and assumed direct control of the fighter squadrons at those bases, as well as support squadrons to carry out their role as the USAF host organizations at the bases.  As a result of this reorganization, the 568th ABG was redesignated the 568th Air Def Gp and assumed control of the fighter squadrons at McGuire., and the 4700th Air Base Group at Sewart was redesignated the 4700th Air Defense Group and was assigned the 330 FIS. A new unit, the 519th Air Defense Group, activated to command the squadrons at Suffolk County. The reorganization also resulted in the wing adding the radar detection, control and warning mission, and it was assigned two Aircraft Control & Warning Squadrons (AC&W Sq) to perform this mission.

In July 1954, McGuire AFB transferred from ADC to Military Air Transport Service and its 1611th Air Transport Wing, which assumed base support functions from the inactivating 568th Air Def Gp. As a result of the group's inactivation, the 2nd FIS and 5th FIS once again reported directly to the wing.

In 1955, ADC implemented Project Arrow, which was designed to bring back on the active list the fighter units which had compiled memorable records in the two world wars. As a result of Project Arrow, the 52d Fighter Group (Air Defense) replaced the 518th Air Def Gp at Suffolk County and the 329th Fighter Group (Air Defense) replaced the 4700th Air Def Gp.  Because Project Arrow called for fighter squadrons to be assigned to their traditional group headquarters, the 2nd and 5th FIS at McGuire AFB moved to Suffolk County AFB and were replaced at McGuire by the 332d FIS and the 539th FIS, which moved from other ADC bases and took over their personnel and aircraft.

In preparation for the implementation of the Semi-Automatic Ground Environment (SAGE) air defense system, the 4621st Air Defense Wing (SAGE) was organized at McGuire in the Spring of 1956 and assigned to the 26th Air Division.  It was initially attached to the 4709th Air Defense Wing and two squadrons programmed for the SAGE system were assigned to the 4709th as well, until the 4621st Wing assumed the mission of the 4709th wing in October, and the 4709th was discontinued shortly thereafter.  Because areas of responsibility were changing with the implementation of SAGE, Dover AFB, Delaware's 46th FIS, flying Starfires had been transferred to the wing from the 4710th Air Defense Wing in March,  as was a second squadron activated at Dover later that month, the 98th FIS, flying F-89 Scorpion aircraft.

Lineage
 Designated as the 4709th Defense Wing and organized on 1 February 1952
 Redesignated as the 4709th Air Defense Wing on 1 September 1954
 Discontinued on 18 October 1956

Assignments
 Eastern Air Defense Force, 1 February 1952
 26th Air Division, 16 February 1953 – 18 October 1956

Components

Wing
 4621st Air Defense Wing, 1 April 1956 – 1 October 1956 (attached)

Groups
 52d Fighter Group (Air Defense)
 Suffolk County AFB, New York, 18 August 1955 – 1 March 1956; 8 July 1956 – 1 October 1956
 329th Fighter Group (Air Defense)
 Sewart AFB, New York, 18 August 1955 – 8 July 1956
 519th Air Defense Group
 Suffolk County AFB, New York, 16 February 1953 – 18 August 1955
 568th Air Base Group (later 568th Air Defense Group), 1 February 1952 – 8 July 1954
 4700th Air Defense Group
 Sewart AFB, New York, 20 September 1954  – 18 August 1955

Squadrons

Fighter Squadrons
 2d Fighter-Interceptor Squadron, 6 February 1952 – 16 February 1953; 8 July 1954 – 18 August 1955
 5th Fighter-Interceptor Squadron, 6 February 1952 – 16 February 1953; 8 July 1954 – 18 August 1955
 45th Fighter-Interceptor Squadron
 Suffolk County AFB, New York, 1 November 1952 – 16 February 1953
 46th Fighter-Interceptor Squadron
 Dover AFB, Delaware, 1 March 1956 – 1 October 1956
 75th Fighter-Interceptor Squadron
 Suffolk County AFB, New York, 14 October 1952 – 16 February 1953
 98th Fighter-Interceptor Squadron
 Dover AFB, Delaware, 8 March 1956 – 1 October 1956
 105th Fighter-Interceptor Squadron
 Berry Field, Tennessee, 6 February 1952, McGhee Tyson Municipal Airport ca. 1 July 1952 – 5 August 1952
 118th Fighter-Interceptor Squadron
 Suffolk County AFB, New York, 6 February 1952 – 1 November 1952
 330th Fighter-Interceptor Squadron
 Sewart AFB, New York, 27 November 1952 – 20 September 1954
 332d Fighter-Interceptor Squadron, 18 August 1955 – 1 October 1956
 539th Fighter-Interceptor Squadron, 18 August 1955 – 1 October 1956

Support Squadrons
 74th Air Base Squadron
 Berry Field, Tennessee, 1 February 1952, McGhee Tyson Municipal Airport ca. 1 July 1952 – 5 August 1952
 77th Air Base Squadron
  Suffolk County AFB, NY, 1 February 1952 – 16 February 1953

Radar Squadrons
 646th Aircraft Control and Warning Squadron
 Navesink (later Highlands AFS), New Jersey, 16 February 1953 – 18 October 1956
 648th Aircraft Control and Warning Squadron
 Ricketts Glen State Park (later Benton AFS), Pennsylvania, 30 June 1953 – 1 July 1956
 770th Aircraft Control and Warning Squadron
 Palermo AFS, New Jersey, 1 March 1956 – 18 October 1956
 773d Aircraft Control and Warning Squadron
 Camp Hero (later Montauk AFS), New York, 18 February 1953 – 1 March 1956; 1 July 1956 – 18 October 1956

Stations
 McGuire AFB, New Jersey, 1 February 1952 – 1 October 1956

Aircraft

 F-47D, 1952
 F-47N, 1952
 F-80C, 1952–1953
 F-84G, 1953
 F-86A, 1952–1953

 F-86D, 1953–1956
 F-86F, 1952–1953
 F-89D, 1956
 F-94A, 1952–1953
 F-94C, 1956

Commanders
 Col. Charles B. Downer, 1 February 1952 – unknown

See also
 List of MAJCOM wings
 List of United States Air Force Aerospace Defense Command Interceptor Squadrons
 List of United States Air Force aircraft control and warning squadrons

References

Notes

Bibliography

 Buss, Lydus H.(ed), Sturm, Thomas A., Volan, Denys, and McMullen, Richard F., History of Continental Air Defense Command and Air Defense Command July to December 1955, Directorate of Historical Services, Air Defense Command, Ent AFB, CO, (1956)
 
 Grant, C.L., The Development of Continental Air Defense to 1 September 1954, (1961), USAF Historical Study No. 126

Further reading
 
 
 
 

4709
Air defense wings of the United States Air Force
Aerospace Defense Command units
Military units and formations established in 1952
Military units and formations in New Jersey